Asclepias quadrifolia, commonly called four-leaved milkweed or fourleaf milkweed, is a species of milkweed in the Apocynaceae (dogbane) family. It is sometimes referred to as whorled milkweed, but it should not be confused with Asclepias verticillata. A. quadrifolia occurs in the eastern United States and Canada.

Description
Fourleaf milkweed is a perennial herb with an upright stem growing from a fleshy rhizome. The stem has a milky sap. Leaves are opposite and appear in 3 to 4 sets on the stem, with one of the higher sets having 4 leaves arranged in a whorl (giving the plant its common name) and the other sets consisting of only 2 leaves.

Pale pink to white flowers are borne in 1 to 3 rounded, usually pendulous clusters, or umbels from the leaf axils and terminus.

They are tufted with white to tan hairs at their tips.

Distribution and habitat
A. quadrifolia is native in the United States from Kansas and Oklahoma in the west, to Mississippi and Alabama in the south, and New Hampshire in the north and east. It is an endangered species in Ontario. Unlike more commonly known species such as common milkweed or butterflyweed, fourleaf milkweed is a woodland denizen. It usually occurs in dry, rocky open forest. It is frequently found on upland slopes.

Ecology
Flowers bloom from May to July. Insects that take nectar from the plant include bumblebees and other bees, wasps, ants, flies, and butterflies. The caterpillars of the monarch butterfly feed on the foliage.

Conservation
A. quadrifolia was listed as an endangered species in Ontario in 2010. Only 2 populations are known to remain in the province, both in Prince Edward County. The plant is also listed as endangered in New Hampshire and threatened in Rhode Island.

Toxicity
Most Asclepias are toxic if consumed in large quantities due to cardiac glycoside and resinoid content.

Cultivation
Fourleaf milkweed is rare in cultivation.

References

External links
University of Texas

quadrifolia
Flora of North America
Flora of Ontario
Butterfly food plants